The Air Tractor AT-500 is a family of agricultural aircraft that first flew in the United States on 25 April 1986, manufactured by Air Tractor Inc. Of monoplane low-wing, taildragger configuration, they carry a chemical hopper between the engine firewall and the cockpit. Compared with their predecessor, the AT-500 family mostly feature a wingspan increased to 50 ft (15.2 m), and an additional fuselage stretch of 22 in (56 cm), allowing for a larger chemical hopper. Almost all variants offer a widened "buddy" seat or a tandem seat for a passenger, observer, or loader; trainer aircraft with full dual controls have also been offered.

From 2011 through 2018, the AT-502B was the world's top-selling agricultural aircraft with 388 deliveries, while the combined AT-500 line (AT-502A, -502B, and -504) was among the world's most popular fixed wing general aviation single-turboprop aircraft families, with 470 delivered—a total exceeded only by the Pilatus PC-12 and the Cessna 208 Caravan family during that time.

Variants
AT-500Prototype
AT-501Piston-powered version with  Pratt & Whitney R-1340 engine, one seat, gross weight of 
AT-502AHot and high version of AT-502 with  PT6A-65AG or  PT6A-60AG engine, one or two seats in tandem or side-by-side arrangement, gross weight of 
AT-502BMain production version, development of AT-502 with  PT6A-34AG engine, one or two seats in tandem or side-by-side arrangement, gross weight of 
AT-502XPUpdated AT-502A with  PT6A-140AG engine
AT-503Production version with  PT6A-45R engine, tandem seats, gross weight of 
AT-503AAT-503 with  PT6A-34AG engine, tandem seats dual controls, AT-501 wings
AT-503TDual-control trainer version of AT-503 with shorter AT-401 wings, tandem seats
AT-504Dual-control trainer version of AT-502B with side-by-side seating, replaced tandem-seat AT-503 trainers, introduced 2009

Specifications (AT-502B)

Notes

References

Bibliography

External links

 http://www.airtractor.com/

AT-501
1980s United States agricultural aircraft
Single-engined turboprop aircraft
Single-engined tractor aircraft
Low-wing aircraft
Aircraft first flown in 1986